The Big East Conference Men's Basketball Freshman of the Year, known as Big East Conference Men's Basketball Rookie of the Year from 1989 to 2015, is a Rookie of the Year award given annually by the Big East Conference to one or more men's basketball players in their first year of competitive play. It was first awarded by the original Big East Conference at the end of its inaugural 1979–80 season. When the conference split along football lines in 2013, the seven schools of the original Big East that did not play FBS football joined with three other schools and formed a new Big East Conference, with the FBS schools remaining in the former Big East structure under the new name of American Athletic Conference (The American). While both offshoot conferences claim the same 1979 starting date and administrative history, the athletic history of the original league is claimed only by the current Big East.

The award, like the other conference awards, is voted on by conference coaches. Coaches are not permitted to vote for players on their teams. The recipient of the award is announced at a press conference immediately preceding the Big East men's basketball tournament, at the same time as the Big East Conference Men's Basketball Player of the Year and the Scholar-Athlete of the Year awards. The ceremony takes place at Madison Square Garden during the tournament. The most recent award recipient was Omari Spellman of Villanova University.

The award was introduced following the conference's first season in 1980, awarded to David Russell of St. John's. Until the 1988–89 season, the award was known as the "Freshman of the Year"; from then through the 2014–15 season, it was known as "Rookie of the Year", and first-year transfers were eligible for the award alongside freshmen. The award once again became "Freshman of the Year" in 2016, with eligibility restricted to freshmen. The award has been shared twice—first after the 2004–05 season by Rudy Gay and Jeff Green, and again after the 2007–08 season by Jonny Flynn and DeJuan Blair. As such, the award has been presented 40 times. As only freshmen are eligible (with first-year transfers also eligible from 1989–2015), it is impossible to win the award more than once. However, the coaches in the conference also award a Preseason Rookie of the Year to one or more players before the start of the NCAA basketball season.

Winners

Winners by school
Georgetown University leads the award count as of 2017 with seven. The Big East split into two conferences in July 2013. One of the leagues, made up entirely of schools that do not sponsor FBS football, retained the Big East name. This group of schools, whose core members are collectively known as the "Catholic 7", includes Georgetown. The other league, which was made up entirely of FBS football schools until non-football school Wichita State University joined in 2017, maintains the charter of the original Big East but now operates as the American Athletic Conference. The University of Connecticut, who initially remained in the renamed conference before rejoining in 2020, has the second most winners, with five. Only 13 of the 23 teams that have participated in Big East Conference men's basketball have had players win the Rookie of the Year award. Member schools which have never won the award include Providence College (in the current Big East), Rutgers University (which left The American for the Big Ten Conference in 2014), the University of Louisville (which left The American for the Atlantic Coast Conference in 2014), the University of South Florida (now in The American), and two schools which joined the current Big East from other conferences in 2013: Butler University and Xavier University. Schools which left the Big East without winning the award include the University of Miami, Virginia Tech, and West Virginia University. Boston College was a founding member in 1979, and left the Big East for the ACC in 2005. Because the college basketball season spans the new year, the year awarded is the year in which that season ended.

Footnotes

See also
Big East Conference Men's Basketball Player of the Year
Big East Conference Women's Basketball Player of the Year
Big East Conference Men's Basketball Defensive Player of the Year
List of All-Big East Conference men's basketball teams

References

External links
Big East Men's Basketball

Big East
Freshman of the Year
Awards established in 1980